This is a list of Mexican Academy Award winners and nominees. This list details the performances of Mexican filmmakers, actors, actresses and films that have either been submitted, nominated or have won an Academy Award.

List of winners

Special Achievement

Best Picture
This list focuses on Mexican-born producers.

Best Director
This list focuses on Mexican-born directors.

Best Actor
This list focuses on Mexican-born actors.

Leading

Supporting

Best Actress
This list focuses on Mexican-born actresses.

Leading

Supporting

Best Animated Feature Film

Best Cinematography
This list focuses on Mexican-born cinematographers.

Best Costume Design

Best Documentary Feature
This list focuses on documentaries features directed by Mexican-born filmmakers.

Best Documentary Short Subject
This list focuses on documentaries short subject directed by Mexican-born filmmakers.

Best Film Editing
This list focuses on Mexican-born film editors.

Best International Feature Film

This list focuses on Mexican films that won or were nominated for the foreign language film award.

Best Live Action Short Film
This list focuses on live action short-films directed by Mexican-born filmmakers.

Best Makeup
This list focuses on Mexican-born makeup artists.

Best Original Score

Best Production Design
This list focuses on Mexican-born art directors/production designers and set decorators.

Best Sound
This list focuses on Mexican-born sound editors and mixers.

Prior to the 93rd Academy Awards, the Best Sound Mixing and Best Sound Editing were separate categories.

Best Writing (Screenplay)
This list focuses on Mexican-born writers.

Adapted

Original

Best Visual Effects

See also

 Cinema of Mexico
 List of Mexican films

References

Lists of Academy Award winners and nominees by nationality or region
Cinema of Mexico
Academy Award